A tachi is a type of Japanese sword.

Tachi may also refer to:

Tachi (surname), a Japanese surname
A Japanese term for Karate stances, varying body positions to attack and defend
A suffix used in the Japanese language to indicate that a word refers to a group, see the article on Japanese grammar
A tribe of Native American Indians in California - see Yokuts and Santa Rosa Rancheria
TOM'S (Tachi Oiwa Motor Sports), TOM'S Co., Ltd (株式会社トムス, Kabushiki-gaisha Tomusu), a factory supported racing team and tuner of Toyota and Lexus vehicles
Tachi (footballer) (Alberto Rodríguez Baró, born 1997), Spanish footballer